Albert Fay Dessent (born January 28, 1949) is a retired Uruguyan-born Salvadoran footballer who  played for several clubs in the Primera División de Fútbol de El Salvador.

External links
soccer-db.info
Alberto Fay at playmakerstats.com (English version of zerozero.pt and ceroacero.es)

1948 births
Living people
Salvadoran people of Uruguayan descent
Naturalized citizens of El Salvador
Association football goalkeepers
Salvadoran footballers
El Salvador international footballers
Alianza F.C. footballers
C.D. Águila footballers
C.D. Atlético Marte footballers